Antonovka is a group of late-fall or early-winter apple cultivars with a strong acid flavor that have been popular in Russia (Soviet Union and the Russian Empire) as well as in Poland and Belarus. The most popular Russian variety is Common Antonovka (Антоновка обыкновенная), from which other cultivars derive. It was developed by pioneer Russian naturalist and plant breeder Ivan V. Michurin at his experimental orchard in the Tambov Oblast and introduced in 1888.

Antonovka is famous for its unsurpassed strong and pleasant fruit aroma.

Polish varieties 

Poland has two varieties: Antonówka Zwykła (same, as in Russia) and Antonówka Biała also known as Śmietankowa (Antonówka White or Creamy) with considerably larger and whiter fruit ripening in late September, but also a shorter shelf life.

Hardiness 

The popularity of the Antonovka tree is enhanced by its ability to sustain long harsh winters, typical in many regions of Eastern Europe and Russia. It also further popular for its superior fruit preservation qualities.  These qualities made the Russian variety especially popular among the dacha owners, and it remains widely grown at dachas in many Post-Soviet states, where it is often called "the people's apple" (народное яблоко). Extremely tolerant of cold weather, and because it produces a single, deep taproot (unusual among apple trees), Antonovka is propagated for use as a rootstock. Antonovka rootstock provides a cold-hardy (to −45 °C), well-anchored, vigorous, standard-sized tree.

Uses 

Due to the relatively low ratio of sugars in the fruit, Antonovka apples are especially well-suited for apple pies and late apple wine. The taste of the wine is noticeably lighter than wine from sweeter cultivars. In Poland, Antonówka is used mostly for apple preserves.

Cultivar of  Antonovka 

Antonovka is a cultivar of vernacular selection, which began to spread  from Kursk region of Russia in the 19th century. While the fruit-bearing trees have not received a wide recognition outside the former Soviet Union, many nurseries do use Antonovka rootstocks, since they impart a degree of winter-hardiness to the grafted varieties.

Culture 
Ivan Bunin's early short story, "Antonov Apples" (1900), is a kind of ode to this apple cultivar as a lyric metaphor to the departing world of Russian landed gentry.

On August 19, 2008 the monument to Antonovka apple was unveiled in Kursk. The sculpture was by Vyacheslav Klykov and has a diameter of 1.5 meter.

Aia Ilu 

The Antonovka is a parent, to Aia Ilu.

See also 
List of apple cultivars

References

External links 

Apple cultivars
Agriculture in Russia